Peter Robert Voser (born 29 August 1958) is a Swiss businessman, who is the chairman of the Swedish-Swiss company ABB. He was the CEO of the Dutch-British corporation Royal Dutch Shell from July 2009 to December 2013. He was interim CEO of ABB from April 2019 to February 2020. He started his career at Royal Dutch Shell in 1982, working in a number of finance and business roles in different countries. From 2002 to 2005 he was chief financial officer for ABB and Royal Dutch Shell. In 2004, he was appointed Royal Dutch Shell's chief financial officer (CFO) and then CEO in July 2009.

Early life
Voser was born in Baden, Switzerland in 1958. From 1979 to 1982 he studied for a Business Administration degree from Zurich University of Applied Sciences, Switzerland.

Career
In 1982, at age 24, Voser joined Shell and held a variety of finance and business roles in Switzerland, the UK, Argentina and Chile, as well as chief financial officer of Oil Products.

From 2002 to 2004, Voser was CFO and an executive committee member of the Asea Brown Boveri (ABB) Group of Companies. Voser is active in a number of international and bilateral organisations, including the European Round Table of Industrialists and The Business Council.

In 2010, he became a director of Catalyst, a non-profit organisation working to build inclusive environments and expand opportunities for women at work.

Voser was CFO of Shell until mid-2009, when he became the company's CEO and was succeeded as CFO by Simon Henry. On 2 May 2013, it was announced that Voser would retire from Shell in the first half of 2014. On 17 April 2019, Voser was named interim Chief Executive Officer of ABB. 
and also Board Director in IBM since 2015.

Other activities

Government agencies
 Economic Development Board (EDB) Singapore, Member of the International Advisory Council

Corporate boards
 Temasek Holdings, Singapore Member of the Board of Directors (since 2015)
PSA International, Singapore, Chairman (since 2019)
 ABB, Sweden, Chairman of the Board of Directors (since 2015)
 IBM, USA, Member of the Board of Directors (since 2014)

Recognition
In July 2011, His Majesty the Sultan of Brunei awarded Voser the title of Dato Seri Laila Jasa in recognition of his services to Brunei. In April 2022 Peter Voser was conferred the Honorary Citizen Award by the Singapore Government.

Controversy 
Royal Dutch Shell paid former chief executive Peter Voser £22m in his last years 2012–2013 through share awards and other performance-related bonuses while the company failed to perform well. Voser was responsible for the controversial projects of the US oil shale lands, the Niger Delta and the Arctic oil exploration.

Personal life
Voser is married to Daniela and has three children. Since September 2013 he has been serving in the position of the chairman of the St. Gallen Foundation for International Studies, replacing Josef Ackermann.

References

European Round Table of Industrialists – Members
Catalyst: Boards
Roche announces change in Board of Directors
Peter Voser entry on Roche Board of Directors

External links

 Meet Shell’s new CEO- Fortune magazine interview (8 Jul 2009)
 Delivering energy through innovation – interview (10 Jan 2011)
 Shell CEO keeps foot on accelerator – interview (14 Jun 2010)
 I’m open to critics but I have a business to run – interview (2 May 2013)

1958 births
Living people
People from Baden, Switzerland
Directors of Shell plc
Swiss chief executives
Swiss expatriates in the Netherlands
Chief financial officers
Chief Executive Officers of Shell plc